MC Skat Kat is an animated cat character who appeared with Paula Abdul in the video for her song "Opposites Attract" in 1989.

History
MC Skat Kat was created by Michael Patterson and performed by the Wild Pair duo of Bruce DeShazer and Marv Gunn on "Opposites Attract". MC Skat Kat's rap was written and performed by Derrick Stevens, although Romany Malco, who did the majority of the writing for the M.C. Skat Kat & the Stray Mob album, is often mistakenly credited for being the voice of the rap on Opposites Attract, a story perpetuated by Abdul herself. Derrick Stevens also provided vocals for the character in the MC Skat Kat solo album.

Patterson got the idea for Skat Kat from the Gene Kelly movie Anchors Aweigh, in which Kelly's character dances with Jerry, the mouse from the Tom and Jerry franchise. Patterson would originally play small gigs dressed in full cat attire, though soon after become a studio musician with the character becoming fully animated by members of the Disney and Warner Bros. animation team, working outside the studios between major projects, under the direction of Chris Bailey.

The character released the album The Adventures of MC Skat Kat and the Stray Mob in 1991 on Kings Records. Paula Abdul made an appearance in the music video of the only single "Skat Strut". The single peaked at No. 80 on the US Billboard Hot 100 in late October 1991, and stayed on the chart for four weeks. "Skat Strut" reached No. 11 on the New Zealand Pop Singles chart, No. 9 on the Norwegian Pop Singles chart, No. 28 on the Dutch Pop Singles chart, No. 31 on the Swedish Pop Singles chart and No. 64 on the UK Singles Chart.

MC Skat Kat also featured in "Yakety Yak, Take It Back", an all-star public service music video produced by Warner Bros. in 1991 for the Take It Back Foundation. The music video featured appearances by numerous celebrities, along with Bugs Bunny, Melba Moore as both herself, and the voice of Tibi the Take it Back Butterfly, and Dr. John as both himself, and the voice of Yakety Yak, for a new version of the song "Yakety Yak" with a message about recycling.

MC Skat Kat later appeared in American Dad! season 11's sixth episode "Kiss Kiss Cam Cam", on February 29, 2016.

MC Skat Kat makes a cameo appearance alongside Paula Abdul in Chip 'n Dale: Rescue Rangers.

The Adventures of MC Skat Kat and the Stray Mob
The Adventures of MC Skat Kat and the Stray Mob is a 1991 album from MC Skat Kat. The album came about as the result of Paula Abdul's successful "Opposites Attract" video of 1990, which was directed by Michael Patterson and Candace Reckinger. The Stray Mob consists of cartoon characters Fatz, Taboo, Micetro, Leo, Katleen, and Silk, the first three of whom appeared in the "Opposites Attract" music video. Two music videos for the album were directed by Patterson and Reckinger, only one of which was released.

The only single from the album, "Skat Strut", samples Earth Wind & Fire's 1981 hit "Let's Groove", with Abdul making a brief appearance in the video. Unlike the "Opposites Attract" video, the animation on the "Skat Strut" music video used digital ink and paint. It only reached number 80 on the Billboard Hot 100 but fared better overseas, peaking at numbers 9 and 31 on the Norwegian and Swedish charts, respectively. The vocal style and length in the music video differed from those from the album version.

Reception

The album was poorly received and it failed to chart. In 1999, The A.V. Club deemed it the "least essential" album of the 1990s, calling it "a product of clueless committee thinking and Milli Vanilli-style studio hackwork at its most cynical", and concluding that "never has a mass-produced album been demanded by so few."

Track listing
 "Big Time" – 3:53
 "I Ain't No Kitty" – 4:37
 "No Dogs Allowed" – 5:28
 "Gotta Get Up" – 4:00
 "Kat in the Casino" – 4:36
 "On the Prowl" – 4:06
 "Skat Strut" – 3:41
 "Kat Stories" – 4:02
 "So Sweet So Young" – 3:47
 "I Go Crazy" – 3:21
 "New Kat Swing" – 4:03
 "Skat Kat's Theme" – 4:39

Discography

Albums
 The Adventures of MC Skat Kat and the Stray Mob (1991)

Singles

References

Fictional cats
Fictional characters introduced in 1989
Male characters in animation
Fictional rappers
Paula Abdul
Fictional characters invented for recorded music